= Ubald Villeneuve =

Canadian Catholic priest

The Reverend Father Ubald Villeneuve OC
- Occupations: Priest, chaplain
- Known for: Co-founding Quebec's first rehabilitation clinic for alcoholics
- Awards: Member of the Order of Canada (1995)

Ubald Villeneuve is a Roman Catholic priest from Quebec.

He served as chaplain to people with alcoholism and drug addiction at the Centre hospitalier Saint-François d'Assise.

He co-founded the first rehabilitation clinic for alcoholics in Quebec, as well as a program to train addiction specialists at the Université de Sherbrooke.

== Honours ==
- 1995 – Member of the Order of Canada
